Md Enamul Haque Zoj ( – 11 January 2023) was a Bangladeshi Jatiya Party (Ershad) politician and a former Jatiya Sangsad member representing the Mymensingh-10 constituency.

Early life
Zoj studied at a Cadet College in Islamabad, Pakistan. He had completed his graduation in Lahore University. He later joined the Pakistan Army in 1968 as secretary of the Cumilla Armed Services Board until 1969. His father, Abdus Salam, served as a headmaster at different schools including at Gafargaon Islamia Govt High School.

Career
Zoj was elected to parliament from Mymensingh-10 as a Jatiya Party candidate in 1986 and 1988.

Personal life and death
Haque lived in Gafargaon, Mymensingh District with his third wife Ruma Haque and son Noor Elahi (b. 2012/2013). In January 2021, he was one of 200 people who was donated a house as prime minister's gift at a programme in Gafargaon.

Haque died on 11 January 2023, at the age of 83.

References

Year of birth missing
Place of birth missing
1930s births
2023 deaths
3rd Jatiya Sangsad members
4th Jatiya Sangsad members
Jatiya Party politicians
People from Mymensingh District